Richard Allen Macksey (July 25, 1931 – July 22, 2019) was Professor of Humanities and Co-founder and longtime Director of the Humanities Center (now the Department of Comparative Thought and Literature) at The Johns Hopkins University, where he taught critical theory, comparative literature, and film studies.  Professor Macksey was educated at Johns Hopkins, earning his B.A. in 1953 and his Ph.D. in 1957.  He taught at Johns Hopkins (both the school of Arts & Sciences as well as the Medical School) since 1958.  He was the longtime Comparative Literature editor of MLN (Modern Language Notes), published by Johns Hopkins University Press.  He was a recipient of the Hopkins Distinguished Alumnus Award. Dr. Macksey also presided over one of the largest private libraries in Maryland, with over 70,000 books and manuscripts. An image of the room overspilling with books has been a popular internet meme in the 2010s and 2020s. 

As Director for the Humanities Center, Macksey, with funding from the Ford Foundation, organized the influential international literary theory symposium, "The Languages of Criticism and the Sciences of Man," which featured prominent academics such as Paul de Man, Jacques Derrida, Roland Barthes, and Jacques Lacan, and where Derrida presented his lecture "Structure, Sign, and Play in the Discourse of the Human Sciences", credited with "tear[ing] down the temple of structuralism." These lectures were collected as The Structuralist Controversy, the most recent version of which was published in 2005.

In 1999 the Richard A. Macksey Professorship for Distinguished Teaching in the Humanities was established by a former student Edward T. Dangel III and his wife, Bonni Widdoes.  The professorship is currently held by Alice McDermott.

Notable students of Richard Macksey include Susan Stewart, Caleb Deschanel, Peter Koper, Walter Murch, Matthew Robbins, and Hollis Robbins.

Publications 
The Structuralist Controversy:  The Languages of Criticism and the Sciences of Man. JHU Press 1970.
Velocities of Change: Critical Essays from MLN (Modern Language Notes)  JHU Press 1974.
The Johns Hopkins Guide to Literary Theory & Criticism.  (Foreword) 2nd Edition. Baltimore: The Johns Hopkins University Press, 2005.

References

Further reading

External links 
Video of Richard Macksey's Library
Gazette bio of Professor Macksey
40th Anniversary Edition of The Structuralist Controversy

1931 births
2019 deaths
Johns Hopkins University faculty
Critical theorists